Mohammad "Baby Jet" Attiah is a retired Ghanaian professional football (soccer) forward. He played two seasons in the North American Soccer League.

In 1966, Attiah began his professional career in Ghana as a sixteen-year-old.  He left Ghana in 1970 to play in Nigeria.  In 1973, the Dallas Tornado of the North American Soccer League brought him to the United States.  He played two seasons in Dallas.  In 1975, he played for the Rhode Island Oceaneers of the American Soccer League.  He played for the team through the 1977 season when the team was known as the New England Oceaneers.  He then played for the Cleveland Force of the Major Indoor Soccer League for three seasons.  He retired in 1981.

In 1984, he became the director of public relations for the Canton Invaders of the American Indoor Soccer Association.

References

External links
NASL stats

1950 births
American Soccer League (1933–1983) players
Cleveland Cobras players
Cleveland Force (original MISL) players
Dallas Tornado players
Ghanaian footballers
Ghanaian expatriate footballers
Major Indoor Soccer League (1978–1992) players
North American Soccer League (1968–1984) players
Rhode Island Oceaneers players
Living people
Association football forwards
Expatriate soccer players in the United States
Ghanaian expatriate sportspeople in the United States